A Wireless Supplicant is a program that runs on a computer and is responsible for making login requests to a wireless network. It handles passing the login and encryption credentials to the authentication server. It also handles roaming from one wireless access point to another, in order to maintain connectivity.

See also
Supplicant
wpa_supplicant
Xsupplicant

References

Wireless networking